Seattle Audubon Society is a nonprofit environmental organization that advocates and organizes for cities where people and birds thrive. It is a chapter organization of the National Audubon Society, and is one of the oldest natural history organizations in the Pacific Northwest.

Seattle Audubon is involved in protecting and enhancing urban habitat, reducing urban hazards to birds, and engaging community in conservation and science initiatives directly in their neighborhoods.

Its main office is in Wedgwood, Seattle, Washington. It serves a chapter area in a large part of King County, Washington. Seattle Audubon collaborates with the Seattle Parks and Recreation Department, the Capitol Hill EcoDistrict, Seattle University, University of Washington, and many other local environmental, community, and government partners.

In July 2022, the organization became the first large chapter in the National Audubon Society network to publicly declare its intention to remove "Audubon" from the organization's name.

History
Seattle Audubon was founded in 1916. 

In 2002 Seattle Audubon launched BirdWeb, an online guide including species of special concern, rarities, and a searchable database of birds. 

In 2005, BirdNote, a two-minute radio show about birds and nature, created under the auspices of Seattle Audubon, began airing on KPLU, a local National Public Radio affiliate. 

In 2020, Seattle Audubon partnered with New York City Audubon to expand dBird.org, an online platform for reporting bird mortality and injury. Scientists and conservationists across North America use dBird.org to track and prevent human-related bird mortality.

Programs

Community Science
Seattle Audubon leads several community science projects, including the Neighborhood Bird Project, Puget Sound Seabird Survey, Climate Watch, and the Seattle Bird Collision Monitoring Project.

Education
Seattle Audubon offers classes and field trips about bird identification, ecology, conservation, and more.

Urban Conservation
Seattle Audubon works to conserve birds in an urban environment.

Urban Forestry
Seattle Audubon has been involved in tree protection in Seattle since its founding when early members advocated for action against illegal tree removal in Seward Park. More recently, its staff have twice served on Seattle's Urban Forestry Commission. The organization advocates for stronger tree protection regulations, improved urban forest management structures, and increased investment in urban forest enhancement.

Urban Hazards
In 2020, Seattle Audubon launched a strategic plan, "Cities at the Center," that put an emphasis on understanding and reducing the impacts of urban hazards on birds. Conservation priorities include understanding and preventing bird-window collisions and reducing pesticide use.

External links 
 Seattle Audubon Society
 Northwest Shade Coffee Campaign
 Forest Friendly Lumber
 BirdWeb
 dBird.org

Environmental organizations based in Washington (state)
Washington
National Audubon Society
Organizations based in Seattle
Education in Seattle